Kate Walsh (née Shimmin; born in 1992) is an Australian netball player in the Suncorp Super Netball league, playing for the Sunshine Coast Lightning.  In August 2019, Jess Thirlby the new England Roses Coach announced Shimmin would join the full time England Roses programme.

Shimmin grew up in South Australia and was a part of the South Australian Institute of Sport Volleyball program before being offered a SASI Netball scholarship which she chose over volleyball. When she finished High School she moved to Canberra where she developed her skills at the Australian Institute of Sport.

Domestic career 
In 2011, after a year at the AIS, Shimmin was offered her first contract to play for the Adelaide Thunderbirds and went on to play for them up until and including the 2016 season, she was a part of the team that won the premiership in the 2013 season. At the end of the 2016 season, she was offered a contract at the Queensland Firebirds for 2017 and had a short stint there before moving back to South Australia to play for the Thunderbirds in the 2018 season. She was re-signed for the 2019 Suncorp Super Netball League by the Adelaide Thunderbirds.. From 2021 she played for the Sunshine Coast Lightning and on 10 November 2022, she announced her retirement from elite netball and will therefore not play in the upcoming Suncorp Superleague Netball Season for 2023

Australia 21/U Team 
She was a part of the Australian 21/U team and represented her country in multiple countries and at the World Youth Cup in Glasgow where she was the Vice Captain of the team. In 2017, Shimmin travelled with the Australian Diamonds as a training partner for the 2017 Quad Series.

Fast5 
Shimmin was a part of the Australian fast5 team From 2012-2017 inclusive that competed in the Fast5 Netball World Series and were runners up in 2013, 2014 and 2015 to rivals New Zealand.

Netball Career Facts 

 AIS Scholarship Holder (2010)
 Adelaide Thunderbirds debut (2011)
 Adelaide Thunderbirds Team Member (2011-2016, 2018–2020)
 Australian Fast 5 Team Member (2012, 2014-2017)
 Australian U21 World Youth Team Vice Captain - 2013
 Adelaide Thunderbirds Tanya Denver Medal Winner (2016)
 Queensland Firebirds Team Member (2017)
 England Roses Full Time Squad (August 2019)
 Sunshine Coast Lightning Team Member (2021-2022)

References

External links
 Sunshine Coast Lightning official player profile. Retrieved on 2022-03-19.
 Suncorp Super Netball player profile. Retrieved on 2022-03-19.

Living people
1992 births
Australian netball players
Australian women's volleyball players
English netball players
Adelaide Thunderbirds players
Queensland Firebirds players
Sunshine Coast Lightning players
Suncorp Super Netball players
Netball players from South Australia
Australian Netball League players
Southern Force (netball) players
Australian Institute of Sport netball players
Australia international Fast5 players
Contax Netball Club players
South Australian Sports Institute netball players
South Australia state netball league players